The firm of Crawford and Reid was a ship building company that had a shipyard at Tacoma, Washington in the first half of the 1900s.

See also
:Category:Ships built by Crawford and Reid

References
 Newell, Gordon, ed, 1966, H.W. McCurdy Maritime History of the Pacific Northwest, Superior Publishing

Defunct companies based in Tacoma, Washington
Shipbuilding in Washington (state)
Steamboats of Washington (state)
Defunct shipbuilding companies of the United States